Tony Jewell may refer to:

 Tony Jewell (footballer) (born 1943), former Australian rules football player
 Tony Jewell (doctor) (born 1950), Chief Medical Officer for Wales